The Troféu Crédito Agrícola is an annual football tournament held at the Estádio Cidade de Coimbra in Coimbra, Portugal.

Matches

2015

2016

2017

2018

2019

Performance by team

References

Portuguese football friendly trophies
Sport in Coimbra
2015 establishments in Portugal
Recurring sporting events established in 2015